The Ultra Architecture Museum is an architectural museum in Seoul, South Korea.

See also
List of museums in South Korea

Museums in Seoul
Architecture museums